Sir Hans Leo Kornberg, FRS (14 January 1928 – 16 December 2019) was a British-American biochemist. He was Sir William Dunn Professor of Biochemistry in the University of Cambridge from 1975 to 1995, and Master of Christ's College, Cambridge from 1982 to 1995.

Early life and education
Kornberg was born in 1928 in Germany to Jewish parents, Max Kornberg (1889–1943) and Selma (née Nathan; 1886–1943) who was murdered. In 1939, he left Nazi Germany (although his parents could not), and moved to the care of an uncle in Yorkshire. Initially he went to a school for German refugees, but later to Queen Elizabeth Grammar School in Wakefield.

On leaving school he became a junior laboratory technician for Hans Adolf Krebs at the University of Sheffield who encouraged him to study further and apply for a scholarship at the same university. He graduated with a BSc Honours in Chemistry in 1949. His interest moved to biochemistry and he studied in the Faculty of Medicine, receiving a PhD degree in 1953 on the studies on urease in mammalian gastric mucosa.

Career 
After receiving Commonwealth Fund Fellowship and working for  two years in Yale University and Public Health Research Institute in USA, he then returned to the UK where his mentor, Sir Hans Krebs, had moved to Oxford University and offered him a post there. This partnership produced a paper in Nature, concerning their discovery of the glyoxylate cycle, and also a joint book entitled Energy Transformations in Living Matter in 1957.

In 1960, he was appointed to the first Chair in Biochemistry at the University of Leicester, which he held until 1975. Later, he was elected as Sir William Dunn Chair of Biochemistry at the University of Cambridge. Hans became a lecturer at Worcester College between 1958 and 1961, and was also the first person to receive The Biochemical Society's annual Colworth Medal on 1963.

He received Christ’s Fellowship in 1975 and was elected as the 34th Master of the Christ's College, Cambridge from 1982 to 1995. In 1995, he retired to take up a position as a Professor of Biology at Boston University, USA, where he taught biochemistry.

Honours and awards

He was elected to the Fellowship of the Royal Society in 1965 and the same year awarded the Colworth Medal of The Biochemical Society. In 1973, he was awarded the Otto Warburg Medal of the German Society for Biochemistry and Molecular Biology.  In the  1978 Queen's Birthday Honours List he was knighted for "services to science". He has been awarded 11 honorary doctorates and has been elected into membership of:
The United States National Academy of Sciences
The German Academy of Sciences "Leopoldina"
The Italian National Academy of Sciences "Lincei"
The American Philosophical Society
The American Academy of Arts and Sciences
The American Society of Biological Chemistry and Molecular Biology
The Japanese Biochemical Society
Phi Beta Kappa Society
and Honorary Fellowship of
The Biochemical Society (UK)
The Royal Society of Biology
Brasenose College (Oxford)
Worcester College (Oxford)
Wolfson College (Cambridge)
The Foulkes Foundation (London)

Personal life
While at Oxford, he also met and married his first wife in 1956, Monica King, and had four children from their marriage: Julia, Rachel, Jonathan and Simon. Monica died in 1989. In 1991, he married Donna Haber. Sir Hans Kornberg died on December 16, 2019.

References

External links
British Humanist Society Distinguished Supporters
 Jewish Year Book, 2005, p. 214: List of Jewish Fellows of the Royal Society
Professor Sir Hans Kornberg FRS in Conversation with Sir James Baddiley FRS October 1990
Current research interests (Boston University Biology Department)
Sir Hans Kornberg (Boston University Biology Department)

1928 births
2019 deaths
Sir William Dunn Professors of Biochemistry
Academics of the University of Leicester
Alumni of the University of Sheffield
Boston University faculty
English biochemists
English emigrants to the United States
English humanists
English people of German-Jewish descent
Fellows of the Royal Society
Fellows of the American Academy of Arts and Sciences
Jewish emigrants from Nazi Germany to the United Kingdom
Jewish scientists
Knights Bachelor
Masters of Christ's College, Cambridge
Foreign associates of the National Academy of Sciences
Members of the German Academy of Sciences Leopoldina
Naturalised citizens of the United Kingdom
People educated at Queen Elizabeth Grammar School, Wakefield
People from Herford
Presidents of the British Science Association
Presidents of the Association for Science Education
Presidents of the International Union of Biochemistry and Molecular Biology